Cyril Marcel Christiani (28 October 1913 – 4 April 1938) was a West Indian cricketer who played in four Test matches in 1934/35.  He played wicketkeeper in all four Tests of the 1934–35 series.

Christiani died in 1938 of malaria. He had three brothers who played first-class cricket for British Guiana, one of whom was the Test cricketer Robert Christiani.

References

1913 births
1938 deaths
West Indies Test cricketers
Sportspeople from Georgetown, Guyana
Guyanese cricketers
Guyana cricketers
Deaths from malaria
Infectious disease deaths in Guyana
Wicket-keepers